Hopkins FBI is a 1998 point-and-click adventure game from MP Entertainment, most famous for very large (at the time) amounts of gore. A sequel titled Hopkins FBI 2: Don't Cry, Baby, involving Hopkins having to rescue the President's daughter, was announced but never released.

Plot
Players assume the role of FBI agent Hopkins, who is on the trail of a criminal mastermind named Bernie Berckson. The pursuit takes the player through a variety of locations, including the FBI headquarters in a modern fictional city, a tropical island, and a submarine base.

Development and release
The game's highly stylized artwork was created by cartoonists, among them French artist Thierry Ségur. The artists drew each scene frame by frame, then they were scanned into the computer  and retouched to produce the finished scenes. Quandary felt that the game was specifically designed for the male teen/pre-teen demographic due to being populated by "available/naked women and mostly bloody, grotesque men".

The soundtrack of the game included licensed songs from the 60's rock band The Troggs ("I Can't Control Myself" and "Lost Girl"), Blue Magoos ("Tobacco Road"), Rare Earth ("Feelin' Alright") and an original game score. The game features a short first-person shooter segment reminiscent of Wolfenstein 3D.

Hopkins FBI was originally released on July 16, 1998. PolyEx Software, Inc. released it for OS/2 Warp. The OS/2 beta release was in French. The small OS/2 market share necessitated cross platform development. The game is known to be one of the first commercial games to be available for Linux, alongside the ports of Doom, Quake and Quake II by id Software, Abuse by Crack dot com, Inner Worlds, and Loki Software's first port, Civilization: Call to Power, which was released in 1999. The Spanish version was distributed by Friendware, the French version by Cryo Interactive, and the Polish version by CD Projekt. Just Adventure described it as a "very strange little game from England that's virtually unknown in North America".

Reception
PC Gamer hated the game due to it being "cack-handed, misogynistic, and mean-spirited". Adventure Gamers thought it was a twisted game that would be a guilty pleasure for some players. Adventure-archiv disliked the small amount of game saves, and the clumsy inventory system. Adventure-Treff thought the player would be frustrated by illogical puzzles and dead ends. Classic Adventure Games deemed it "a true British game".

References

External links 
 

1998 video games
Adventure games
BeOS games
CD Projekt games
Cryo Interactive games
Federal Bureau of Investigation in fiction
Linux games
OS/2 games
Point-and-click adventure games
ScummVM-supported games
Single-player video games
Video games about police officers
Video games developed in France
Windows games
Sprite-based first-person shooters